Regula may refer to:

 Regula (name)
 Regula (architecture), a feature of the Doric order in classical architecture
 Regula (saint), a Coptic Orthodox and Roman Catholic saint
 Regula (ship, 1993), a passenger ship operating on Lake Zurich in Switzerland
 Regula Range, a mountain range of Queen Maud Land, Antarctica
 Regula Ltd., former Deutsche Bank subsidiary